Confederation Secondary School is a school in Val Caron, Ontario, Canada. Enrollment as of November 2022 is 602.

History 

Confederation S.S. was built as a Canadian Centennial project, and opened in September 1967, making it the first English secondary school in Valley East, Ontario.

Football 

Like all sports teams at Confederation, the mascot is a Charger.

Its football program began in 1968 with a Junior Program but, due to financial constraints and a serious injury to a player, the team was discontinued in the mid-1980s. Confederation was without football from that time until the fall of 2002 when it fielded a varsity team which posted a 2–4 record in its first season. This was considered an accomplishment as the last expansion team of Sudbury District Secondary School Athletic Association, the St. Benedict Catholic Secondary School Bears, had to wait a full seven seasons before their first win.

The Chargers have become a regular member of the post-season. In 2003, they made the playoffs for the first time and knocked off the perennial powerhouse St. Charles College Cardinals by a score of 30–16. They then handed the previously undefeated Lasalle Secondary School Lancers their only loss of the season in the championship game by a score of 14-7. Interest in football all across Greater Sudbury then spiked as several high schools hoped to duplicate Confederation's success.

The Sudbury Secondary School Northstars took the field for the first time in over 20 years in 2003 but were unable to match the Chargers' success, going winless in three of four seasons and folding in 2007. To replace them that fall was the Lively District Secondary School Hawks who have traditionally fielded excellent flag football teams.  However, in their first season, they also went winless.

Outdoor education 

Situated in Northern Ontario's Boreal Forest, Confederation offers an outdoor education program.

These courses provide opportunities to develop a personalized approach to healthy active living through participation in classroom activities combined with strenuous outdoor experiences. Students are expected to explore and demonstrate appropriate knowledge, skills, and attitudes in three interconnected themes:
 Outdoor Skills – necessary for safe comfortable outdoor experiences in all seasons
 Personal Development – team-building and leadership skills which stress understanding, respect, and appreciation for self and others
 Environmental Understanding – awareness and respect of all living things and an understanding of basic ecological processes

Students learn wilderness skills such as first aid, Nordic skiing, snowshoeing, winter camping, wilderness survival, ecology, hiking, orienteering, backpacking, swimming, canoeing, weather interpretation, teamwork, and leadership. Each semester the classes take canoe trips through the Temagami wilderness, hiking trips in Killarney Provincial Park, and a winter camping trip where they sleep in quinzhees they have constructed.

Music 
Confederation was the home of the Evolutionary Rock Band. It was started and run by teacher Norm McIntosh since 1979 (when it was known as the Confed Rock Band). McIntosh was the inaugural recipient of the Canadian Music Teacher of the Year Juno award. He was presented $25000 for the band's many costs on behalf of the musicians' band-aid program.

The band consists of four vocalists, an eight-piece rhythm section, four trumpets, four trombones, two alto saxes, four tenor saxes, and a 15-member stage crew. The crew can be farther divided into jobs including sound technicians, guitar effects technicians, light and effects technicians, a fog technician, two spotlight operators, and a crew manager. Evolutionary band and crew member students are between the ages of 14 and 18. The band was featured on Canada AM in April 2007 for its success in breaking the Guinness world record for 'deepest concert below the Earth's surface'.

In 2008, Evolutionary was recognized as Junior Citizens of the Year at the Community Builders Awards of Excellence for the City of Greater Sudbury.

Evolutionary has been visited by such artists as The Tragically Hip, Hedley, Keshia Chanté, Sloan, Suzie McNeil, The Trews, Three Days Grace, Finger Eleven, and record producer Bob Ezrin.

Despite the fact that most of the bands' activities take place outside regular school hours, the students involved in the Evolutionary band receive a full credit towards high school graduation.

Confederation is the only school in Canada with a professional recording studio. This recording studio is used for a full-credit recording course, which is the only one of its type in Ontario at the high school level. Students are taught how to use the most up-to-date recording software. They gain experience working on short CDs for local artists and they learn how to make radio commercials.

Drama and improvisation 
The school has a beginning theater production as well as an improv team in the Canadian Improv tournament. The production and the team have been there for four years and consist of grades 9-12.

Administration 
The school is overseen by the Rainbow District School Board.
2018-2020 administration was:
Principal: Punkari
Vice-Principal: Wilson

See also
List of high schools in Ontario

References

External links 

High schools in Greater Sudbury
1967 establishments in Ontario
Educational institutions established in 1967